Suzannah "Suzie" Fraser (born 27 August 1983 in Brisbane, Queensland) is an Australian water polo player, who joined the women's national team in 2005. She was a member of the side that won the silver medal at the 2007 World Aquatics Championships in Melbourne, Australia, after having claimed the title at the 2006 FINA Women's Water Polo World Cup the previous year. Previously, Fraser had attended Brisbane Girls Grammar School.

See also
 List of Olympic medalists in water polo (women)
 List of World Aquatics Championships medalists in water polo

References
 Profile

External links
 

1983 births
Living people
Australian female water polo players
Sportswomen from Queensland
Olympic bronze medalists for Australia in water polo
Water polo players at the 2008 Summer Olympics
Medalists at the 2008 Summer Olympics
Sportspeople from Brisbane
World Aquatics Championships medalists in water polo